The Chew Valley Hoard is a hoard of 2,528 coins from the mid 11th century, very shortly after the Norman Conquest of England in 1066. The hoard was found in the Chew Valley, Somerset, England in 2019. It is one of the largest finds of Norman coins in the UK.

Discovery

The hoard was discovered by metal detectorists Lisa Grace and Adam Staples in January 2019.

Items discovered

The hoard consists of 2,528 silver coins, including 1,236 coins of Harold II and 1,310 coins of William I. The coins include some mules. Mules are coins which have the head of one king on one side and a different king on the other.

Purpose

The exact purpose of the hoard is unknown, but it has been speculated that some of the coins may represent an attempt at avoiding the taxes in place at the time by reusing designs from earlier coins. Some of the coins may come from previously unknown mints.

The likely date of burial of the hoard is 1067–1068, just a year or two after the Norman Conquest, and may reflect the instability in the country at the time. In 1067, Eadric the Wild had rebelled with the Welsh rulers of Gwynedd and Powys, and attacked Hereford; in 1068 William the Conqueror laid siege to Exeter; and later in 1068, the sons of the deposed King Harold, Godwine and Edmund, returned from Ireland, and raided the coast around the mouth of the River Avon and parts of Somerset. This latter event may have been the immediate impetus for the burial of the hoard.

Inquest and valuation

, coroner's treasure inquest is still to be held to determine the status of the hoard. The inquest may declare that the coins are treasure, and therefore became property of the Crown. Under the terms of the 1996 Treasure Act, a museum may purchase the hoard at the price valued by the Treasure Valuation Committee, with the purchase price being given jointly to the finder and landowner as a reward. It has been estimated that the hoard may be worth £5 million.

Display

The coins are being examined at the British Museum, but may be acquired by Bath and North East Somerset council for display at the Roman Baths in Bath.

See also
 List of hoards in Britain

References

2019 archaeological discoveries
Medieval European metalwork objects
Metal detecting finds in England
History of Somerset
Bath and North East Somerset